I'm Gonna Get You may refer to:

 I'm Gonna Get You (Billy Swan song), 1987, also released by Eddy Raven in 1988
 I'm Gonna Get You (Bizarre Inc song), 1992